Anthony M. Ornato is the former assistant director of the United States Secret Service Office of Training. He was the service's deputy assistant director who headed the security detail of president Donald Trump until taking a leave of absence when the president named him White House Deputy Chief of Staff for operations in December 2019.  After his tenure as a political appointee in the Trump administration, he returned to the Secret Service where he worked as the assistant director in the office of training until August 29, 2022.

Early life and education
Ornato is a native of Connecticut. His family owned a tavern near New Haven popular with police and firefighters.

Ornato received a bachelor and master of science degree from the School of Forensic Science at University of New Haven (1995 & 1999), and a master of administrative leadership from The University of Oklahoma in 2016.

Career 

Ornato was a police officer for two years in Waterbury, CT. He became a special agent in 1997 and worked as a criminal investigator in the New Haven Resident Office. He has been a member of the U.S. Secret Service for over 20 years. Since joining the Secret Service in 1997 he has worked in a variety of departments, including the Presidential Protective Division, Protective Operations, and Criminal Investigations. He has also worked as a special agent.

Ornato worked in the Presidential Protective Division during the administrations of George W. Bush, Barack Obama and Donald Trump. While reports were being shared in the media in 2019 that Trump entered the DMZ in Korea unaccompanied and without military protection, the AP Wire reported that while Trump did become the first U.S. president to cross into North Korea, he was accompanied by security--that is, by Tony Ornato.

After having worked on the Trump presidential detail for three years, Ornato received the unprecedented permission to temporarily take a leave of absence to become a White House political advisor.  In December 2019, Trump announced that Ornato would be changing roles: "“The United States Secret Service Deputy Assistant Director, Anthony Ornato, will become my new Deputy Chief of Staff for Operations."   With this shift Ornato left his role as protective agent to become a manager responsible for all aspects of security, travel, information technology, military operations, scheduling and operational logistics required in support of the President," managing a budget of approximately $800 million and leading a workforce  of over 5,000 persons. He and his team provided management and administration services, human resources support, financial oversight, and medical support. He managed the Residence staff assigned to the president and the Executive Office of the President complex. Ornato also had responsibility for a variety of offices related to the White House, including Camp David, the Presidential Airlift Group, the Presidential Marine Helicopter Squadron, the White House Communications Agency. He was also responsible for the "Presidential Continuity Policy, Plans and Requirements."

During his tenure on Trump's staff he helped to organize the Donald Trump photo op at St. John's Church, an event that generated controversy. Ornato had participated in coordinating the logistics of the event. The Project on Government Oversight noted that "it remains unclear whether Ornato's role in the events of Lafayette Square ever came under scrutiny."

In mid December, during a meeting Trump was holding with Rudy Giuliani, Sidney Powell, Michael Flynn and former Overstock.com CEO Patrick M. Byrne, Cassidy Hutchinson texted Ornato saying, “the west wing is UNHINGED.” Ornato responded to her, saying, "oh holy hell."  In late December 2020, Trump aides consulted with Ornato regarding the president’s desire to ride in a motorcade accompanying January 6 marchers protesting the election of Joe Biden as the next President of the United States. Trump later said he wanted to accompany the marchers but that he was prevented from doing so. In an interview in April with The Washington Post, Trump expressed regret over not marching to the U.S. Capitol the day his supporters stormed the building. He said he pressed to join the march that day but was stopped by his security detail. “Secret Service wouldn’t let me,” Trump said. “I wanted to go. I wanted to go so badly. Secret Service says you can’t go. I would have gone there in a minute.”

During her June 2022 testimony before the House Select Committee on the January 6 Attack, former Trump White House aide Cassidy Hutchinson said she had been told by Ornato that after Trump got into the presidential SUV following his January 6 Ellipse rally, hoping to drive to the Capitol as his supporters marched there, his lead Secret Service agent Robert Engel told him it was too dangerous and informed him they were returning to the White House. Hutchinson said Ornato told her Trump became irate and attempted to grab the steering wheel of the vehicle, and lunged at Engel's clavicles. She testified Engel was present with Ornato as he related the incident but never contradicted the account. CNN reported three days after Hutchinson's testimony that it had spoken with two Secret Service agents who had heard accounts of the incident from multiple other agents since February 2021, including Trump's driver. Although details differed, agents confirmed there was an angry confrontation, with one agent relating that Trump "tried to lunge over the seat — for what reason, nobody had any idea," but no one asserted Trump attacked Engel. A separate Secret Service official told CNN that Engel denied that Trump grabbed at the steering wheel or lunged toward an agent on his detail, and that Ornato denied telling Hutchinson such. Politico reported the same day that Engel told the committee during an early 2022 deposition that he had kept his full account of the incident from his Secret Service colleagues for at least fourteen months.

Hutchinson testified that on the morning of January 6, Ornato told White House Chief of Staff Mark Meadows that participants in Trump’s rally had weapons, and that Ornato told her he had also informed Trump. Keith Kellogg, an advisor to Pence, reportedly told Ornato that Pence refused with good reason to be evacuated from the Capitol by the Secret Serve as the rioting was proceeding. But Politico’s Kyle Cheney reported that Ornato testified to the Jan. 6 committee that he incorrectly told Mark Meadows that Pence had already been evacuated when Trump sent a tweet attacking Pence at 2:24 p.m.

Washington Post reporter Carol Leonnig, author of a 2021 book on the  Secret Service, characterized Engel and Ornato as "very, very close to President Trump." During an MSNBC interview she stated: "some people accused them of at times being enablers and 'yes men' of the president — particularly Tony Ornato — and very much people who wanted to ... see him pleased." Leonnig said there was a large contingent of Trump's Secret Service detail that wanted Biden to fail and some "took to their personal media accounts to cheer on the insurrection and the individuals riding up to the Capitol as patriots."

Ornato has been interviewed twice by the United States House Select Committee on the January 6 Attack, and the Secret Service announced that Ornato will be made available to testify under oath to the committee.

Ornato retired from the Secret Service on August 29, 2022, announcing his intent to "pursue a career in the private sector."

References 

1974 births
Living people
United States Secret Service agents
University of New Haven alumni
University of Oklahoma alumni